The Metropolitan is an Australian Turf Club Group 1 Thoroughbred horse race held under open handicap conditions, for horses aged three years old and older, over a distance of 2,400 metres at Randwick Racecourse, Sydney, Australia in early October. The total prize money for this race is A$750,000.

History

The race when first run in 1863 was known as the Great Metropolitan Stakes.
It is one of the main races in the Sydney Spring Carnival held in early October at Randwick Racecourse, along with the Epsom Handicap.
Many great household names have won this race, but none have won the treble of The Metropolitan, Caulfield Cup and Melbourne Cup. Prior to 2004 the race was run on the first Monday in October, the Labour Day holiday.

1942 racebook

Name
 1863–1888 - Great Metropolitan Stakes
 1889–1897 - Metropolitan Stakes
 1898–1978 - Metropolitan Handicap
 1979 onwards - The Metropolitan

Grade
 1863–1978 - Principal Race
 1979 onwards - Group 1

Distance
 1863–1891 – 2 miles (~3200 metres)
 1891–1919 - 1 miles (~2400 metres)
 1920–1971 - 1 miles (~2600 metres)
 1972–1982 – 2600 metres
 1983 – 2400 metres
 1984–2000 – 2600 metres 
 2001 onwards - 2400 metres

Venue
The race has been the major long distance event in the Sydney Spring Racing Carnival and has been run at Randwick Racecourse, with one exception in 1983 when the race was run at Warwick Farm Racecourse.

Winners

 2022 - No Compromise 
 2021 - Montefilia 
2020 - Mirage Dancer 
2019 - Come Play With Me 
2018 - Patrick Erin 
2017 - Foundry
2016 - Sir John Hawkwood
2015 - Magic Hurricane
2014 - Opinion
2013 - Seville
2012 - Glencadam Gold
2011 - The Verminator
2010 - Herculian Prince
2009 - Speed Gifted
2008 - Newport
2007 - †race not held
2006 - Tawqeet
2005 - Railings
2004 - County Tyrone
2003 - Bedouin
2002 - Victory Smile
2001 - Dress Circle
2000 - Coco Cobanna
1999 - Vita Man
1998 - In Joyment
1997 - Heart Ruler
1996 - Hula Flight
1995 - Electronic
1994 - Glastonbury
1993 - Zamination
1992 -	Te Akau Nick
1991 -	Lord Revenir
1990 -	Donegal Mist
1989 -	Hunter
1988 -	Natski
1987 -	Balciano
1986 -	Born To Be Queen
1985 -	Spritely Native
1984 -	Hayai
1983 -	Hayai
1982 -	Nicholas John
1981 -	Belmura Lad
1980 -	Brindisi
1979 -	Earthquake McGoon
1978 -	Ming Dynasty
1977 -	Sir Serene
1976 -	Battle Heights
1975 -	Bon Teint
1974 -	Passetreul
1973 -	Analie
1972 -	Altai Khan
1971 -	Oncidon
1970 -	Tails
1969 -	Tails
1968 -	Wiedersehen
1967 -	General Command
1966 -	Duo
1965 -	Striking Force
1964 -	Piper's Son
1963 -	Galerus
1962 -	The Dip
1961 -	Waipari
1960 -	Red Wind
1959 -	Macdougal
1958 -	Monte Carlo
1957 -	Straight Draw
1956 -	Redcraze
1955 -	Beaupa
1954 -	Commodore
1953 -	Carioca
1952 -	Dalray
1951 -	Delta
1950 -	Conductor
1949 -	Count Cyrano
1948 -	Buonarroti Boy
1947 -	Murray Stream
1946 -	Cordale
1945 -	Murray Stream
1944 -	Nightbeam
1943 -	Main Topic
1942 -	Grand Fils
1941 -	Dashing Cavalier
1940 -	Beau Vite
1939 -	Feminist
1938 -	Royal Chief
1937 -	Sir Regent
1936 -	Young Crusader
1935 -	Oro
1934 -	Waikare
1933 -	Regal Son
1932 -	Denis Boy
1931 -	Strength
1930 -	Cragford
1929 - Loquacious
1928 - Jocelyn
1927 - Murillo
1926 - Star Stranger
1925 - Bard Of Avon
1924 - Polycletan
1923 - Sir Andrew
1922 - Speciality
1921 - Laddie Blue
1920 - Pershore
1919 - Rebus
1918 - Kennaquhair
1917 - Cagou
1916 - Quinologist
1915 - St. Carwyne
1914 - St. Spasa
1913 - Cagou
1912 - Duke Foote
1911 - Malt King
1910 - Eric
1909 - Maltine
1908 - Mooltan
1907 - Mooltan
1906 - Solution (NZ)
1905 - Maniapoto
1904 - Alias
1903 - Marvel Loch
1902 - Queen Of Sheba
1901 - San Fran
1900 - Reviver
1899 - Cremona
1898 - Cravat
1897 - Survivor
1896 - The Skipper
1895 - Nobleman
1894 - Projectile
1893 - Paris
1892 - Althotas
1891 - Yowi
1890 - Little Bernie
1889 - Abercorn
1888 - Lamond
1887 - Cardigan
1886 - The Bohemian
1885 - Acolyte
1884 - Sir Modred
1883 - The Gem
1882 - Masquerade
1881 - Hesperian
1880 - The Pontiff
1879 - Secundus
1878 - Democrat
1877 - Amendment
1876 - Nemesis
1875 - Goldsbrough
1874 - Sterling
1873 - Horatio
1872 - Dagworth
1871 - Rosebud
1870 - Croydon
1869 - Circassian
1868 - The Barb
1867 - Tim Whiffler
1866 - Bylong
1865 - Volunteer
1864 - Tarragon
1863 - Regno

† Not held because of outbreak of equine influenza

See also
 List of Australian Group races
 Group races

References

Open middle distance horse races
Group 1 stakes races in Australia
Randwick Racecourse